K66 or K-66 may refer to:

K-66 (Kansas highway), a state highway in Kansas
Mass in C major, K. 66 "Dominicus"
HMS Begonia (K66), a UK Royal Navy ship